The Virginia Dare Memorial Bridge is a four-lane automobile bridge spanning the Croatan Sound, between Manns Harbor and Roanoke Island, in Dare County, North Carolina.  The bridge carries US 64 Bypass and is utilized by local and seasonal tourist traffic.

The bridge is dedicated to the memory of Virginia Dare, the first English child born in the Americas, in 1587.

The bridge deck has 7,250 tons of epoxy-coated reinforcement steel and was designed with a 100-year life span.

The bridge complements the William B. Umstead Bridge, which carries US 64, between Manns Harbor and Manteo and is located further north.  The bridge, along with the Washington Baum Bridge and Melvin R. Daniels Bridge connects the North Carolina mainland with the Outer Banks communities.

History
In 1996, two hurricanes forced evacuation of the Outer Banks area during peak tourist season. The existing William B. Umstead Bridge, built in 1955, was unable to handle the high volume of traffic during the evacuation.  To help alleviate traffic congestion and provide an additional emergency evacuation route from the Outer Banks, planning for the new bridge began in earnest.  In January 1997, Wilbur Smith Associates was selected for the design of the bridge.  In April 1998, Balfour Beatty Construction was awarded the prime construction contract.

On August 16, 2002, the bridge was dedicated by NCDOT Secretary Lyndo Tippett and was opened that day.  The bridge initially carried US 64 Bypass and US 264 Bypass; but in September 2003, US 264 Bypass was removed.

See also

References

External links
 

Buildings and structures in Dare County, North Carolina
Bridges completed in 2002
Road bridges in North Carolina
Transportation in Dare County, North Carolina
2002 establishments in North Carolina
U.S. Route 64
Bridges of the United States Numbered Highway System
Roanoke Island
Concrete bridges in the United States
Girder bridges in the United States